Batang Sadong Bridge or Sungai Buloh Bridge is a major bridge connecting Sadong Jaya near Asajaya and Sadong near Simunjan in Samarahan Division, Sarawak, Malaysia. Opened on 16 October 2016, the  bridge is now the third longest bridge in Malaysia across a river replacing the ferry service across Batang Sadong river.

References 
Penang second bridge-Sultan Abdul Halim Muadzam Shah Bridge

Penang Bridge - Penang Bridge

Bridges in Sarawak